The Dinosauria is an extensive book on dinosaurs, compiled by David B. Weishampel, Peter Dodson, and Halszka Osmólska. It has been published in 2 editions, with the first edition published in 1990, consisting of material from 23 scientists. The second, greatly revised edition, was published in 2004, with material from 43 scientists. Both editions were published by University of California Press.

The book covers a wide range of topics about dinosaurs, including their systematics, anatomy, and history. It has been lauded as "the best scholarly reference work available on dinosaurs" and "an historically unparalleled compendium of information" and by Padian (1991) as a "monumental work" which features the work of 23 dinosaur specialists: "an instant classic".

Editions
Weishampel, D. B., Dodson, P., & Osmólska, H. (1990). The Dinosauria. Berkeley: University of California Press.
Weishampel, D. B., Dodson, P., Osmólska, H., & Hilton, Richard P. (2004). The Dinosauria. Berkeley: University of California Press.

References

External links
Preview of  second edition (2004) at books.google.com
 Review of second edition
 PDF-version of chapter 22: "Basal Ceratopsia", from second edition

Dinosaur books
Paleontology books
1990 non-fiction books
Encyclopedias of science